Shamiel Gary (born May 31, 1990) is a former American football safety. He played his first two college football seasons at Wyoming, where he was a Freshman All-American, before transferring to Oklahoma State and redshirting in 2011. He was signed by the New England Patriots as an undrafted free agent in 2014. He also played for the Chicago Bears.

Early years and high school career
Shamiel Gary was born in Tulsa, Oklahoma on May 31, 1990, to Gwen Evans and Steven Gary. He attended Booker T. Washington High School in Tulsa (OK), where he played safety for head coach Antwain Jimmerson. As a senior, he helped lead the Hornets to a 13-1 record and an Oklahoma 5A State Championship, as he recorded 124 tackles and 8.0 sacks. In the same year he was named the 5A District 3 Defensive Player of the Year.

College career
Out of high school, Gary was recruited by Air Force, Kansas State, and Wyoming. He chose to attend the latter, where he played strong safety for head coach Dave Christensen. On September 5, 2009 in the season opener versus Weber State, Gary recorded 7 tackles and three interceptions. As a true freshman, he started 12 of 13 games at strong safety, tied the team lead in interceptions (3) and ranked fifth on the team in tackles (98). In 2010, he recorded 94 tackles, 5 passes defended and one interception. At the end of his sophomore season he transferred to Oklahoma State to be closer to his family and his grandmother, who was battling Alzheimer's disease. He sat out the 2011 season due to the NCAA transfer rules. In 2012, he started every game for the Cowboys, recording 72 tackles, 6 passes defended, three interceptions and one forced fumble. As a senior, he recorded 47 tackles, 9 passes defended and three interceptions, as he helped lead the Oklahoma State Cowboys to a 10-3 record and a 2nd place in the Big 12 Conference. At the end of the season, the Cowboys were invited to the Cotton Bowl Classic, where they lost to Missouri by a score of 31-41. Gary recorded one tackle during the game.

Professional career

New England Patriots
Gary was not drafted during the 2014 NFL Draft. On May 12, 2014, he was signed by the New England Patriots as an undrafted free agent. On August 30, 2014, he was released by the Patriots in order to get down to the 53-man active roster limit.

Chicago Bears
On October 8, 2014, Gary was signed by the Chicago Bears to a one-year contract, following injuries to Bears' safeties Chris Conte and Ahmad Dixon. He was waived by the team on October 11, 2014 and then signed to the Bears' practice squad on October 13, 2014.

Miami Dolphins
On January 8, 2015, Gary signed a futures contract with the Miami Dolphins. On August 10, 2015, he was waived by the Dolphins. On November 3, 2015, he was again signed to the Dolphins' practice squad. On November 28, 2015, he was promoted to the active roster.

On September 3, 2016, Gary was released by the Dolphins.

Minnesota Vikings
On September 5, 2016, Gary was signed to the Vikings' practice squad. On September 13, he was released from their practice squad.

Second stint with Patriots
On October 25, 2016, Gary was signed to the Patriots' practice squad. On November 26, 2016, he was released from their practice squad.

Buffalo Bills
On December 1, 2016, Gary was signed to the Bills' practice squad. On December 13, 2016, he was promoted to the active roster. He was waived on September 2, 2017.

NFL statistics

References

1990 births
Living people
African-American players of American football
Players of American football from Oklahoma
Sportspeople from Tulsa, Oklahoma
Wyoming Cowboys football players
Oklahoma State Cowboys football players
New England Patriots players
Chicago Bears players
Miami Dolphins players
Minnesota Vikings players
Buffalo Bills players
21st-century African-American sportspeople